L. Gerard Greenan (born 17 February 1950) is a Canadian politician. He was elected to the Legislative Assembly of Prince Edward Island in the 2007 provincial election. He represents the electoral district of Summerside-St. Eleanors and is a member of the Liberal Party. On June 12, 2007, he was appointed to the Executive Council of Prince Edward Island as Attorney General and Minister of Education. In an April 2008 cabinet shuffle, he was styled Minister of Education and Early Childhood Development. Greenan was dropped from cabinet in January 2010.

On January 23, 2015, Greenan announced he would not seek re-election in the 2015 election.

Election results

References

1950 births
Living people
Members of the Executive Council of Prince Edward Island
People from Charlottetown
People from Summerside, Prince Edward Island
Prince Edward Island Liberal Party MLAs
21st-century Canadian politicians